Group B was one of two groups of the 2015 IIHF World Championship. The four best placed teams advanced to the playoff round, while the last placed team was relegated to Division I in 2016.

Standings

All times are local (UTC+2).

1 May

United States vs Finland

Russia vs Norway

2 May

Slovakia vs Denmark

Belarus vs Slovenia

Norway vs United States

3 May

Russia vs Slovenia

Belarus vs Slovakia

Denmark vs Finland

4 May

Russia vs United States

Norway vs Finland

5 May

Denmark vs Belarus

Slovakia vs Slovenia

6 May

Russia vs Denmark

Slovakia vs Norway

7 May

United States vs Belarus

Finland vs Slovenia

8 May

Slovenia vs Norway

United States vs Denmark

9 May

Belarus vs Russia

Finland vs Slovakia

Denmark vs Norway

10 May

Slovenia vs United States

Slovakia vs Russia

11 May

Finland vs Belarus

Slovenia vs Denmark

12 May

Norway vs Belarus

United States vs Slovakia

Finland vs Russia

References

External links
Official website

B